Wakefield station is an MBTA Commuter Rail station in Wakefield, Massachusetts served by the Haverhill Line. The station has two side platforms, which are not accessible, serving the line's two tracks. The station building, constructed in 1889, was listed on the National Register of Historic Places in 1989 as Wakefield Upper Depot.

History

The Boston and Maine Railroad built its mainline through South Reading in 1845, primarily through the efforts of Thomas Spaulding, a local businessman. The first station was a wooden structure on the east side of the tracks. A new station building was constructed in 1889; the original depot was relocated and converted to a freight house. By 1893, the town had six stations with as many as 60 trains per day. The building is architecturally distinctive in the town as an example of Panel Brick architecture. 

The station building was converted to commercial use by 1968. A fire in one of the businesses inside gutted the structure late on December 17, 1974. The -thick brick walls survived the fire; it was rebuilt by 1977, with a pharmaceutical company the first occupant. The building was listed on the National Register of Historic Places in 1989 as Wakefield Upper Depot.

The former Lynnfield Centre depot from the Newburyport Railroad line, closed in 1959, is located at the north end of the 1889-built station.

References

External links

MBTA - Wakefield
Station on Google Maps Street View

MBTA Commuter Rail stations in Middlesex County, Massachusetts
Stations along Boston and Maine Railroad lines
Railway stations in the United States opened in 1889
Railway stations on the National Register of Historic Places in Massachusetts
Buildings and structures in Wakefield, Massachusetts
National Register of Historic Places in Wakefield, Massachusetts